Diocese of Trebinje may refer to:

 Roman Catholic Diocese of Trebinje, common name of the Roman Catholic Diocese of Trebinje-Mrkan, with seat in the city of Trebinje
 Serbian Orthodox Diocese of Trebinje, former common name of the current Serbian Orthodox Eparchy of Zahumlje and Herzegovina, when its seat was in the city of  Trebinje

See also
Trebinje
Catholic Church in Bosnia and Herzegovina
Eastern Orthodoxy in Bosnia and Herzegovina
Diocese of Banja Luka (disambiguation)
Diocese of Sarajevo (disambiguation)
Diocese of Mostar (disambiguation)